KPHS (90.3 FM) was a high school radio station at Plains High School in Plains, Texas.  The station was owned by Plains Independent School District. Its license was not renewed and expired on August 1, 2021.

References

High school radio stations in the United States
PHS
Yoakum County, Texas
2021 disestablishments in Texas
Radio stations disestablished in 2021
Defunct radio stations in the United States
PHS